KCPC may refer to:

 KCPC (FM), a radio station (88.3 FM) licensed to serve Camino, California, United States
 Korean Central Presbyterian Church